David "Dave" Moffat (born 17 June 1971) is a former professional rugby league footballer who played in the 1990s. He played at representative level for Ireland, and at club level for Hull F.C.

International honours
Dave Moffat won a cap for Ireland while at Hull during 1996.

References

External links
 (archived by web.archive.org) Stats → PastPlayers → M at hullfc.com
 (archived by web.archive.org) Statistics at hullfc.com

1971 births
Australian expatriate sportspeople in England
Australian people of Irish descent
Australian rugby league players
Hull F.C. players
Ireland national rugby league team players
Living people
Place of birth missing (living people)